Mahmudabad (also Romanized as Maḩmūdābād) is a village in Feyziyeh Rural District, in the Central District of Babol County, Mazandaran Province, Iran. At the 2006 census, its population was 259, in 59 families.

References 

Populated places in Babol County